Mitochondrial complex II deficiency, also called CII deficiency, is a rare mitochondrial disease. As of 2013, about thirty-six cases had been reported.

Signs and symptoms
Mitochondrial complex II deficiency affects the body's mitochondria and can have a variety of presentations. In some cases, the brain, heart, liver, kidneys, and muscles are affected, while in other cases, only the heart and muscles are affected with adult onset. Common symptoms include the Babinski sign, muscle weakness, distal amyotrophy (muscle wasting of the limbs), developmental regression (loss of developmental milestones), and being easy to fatigue.

Causes
CII deficiency is a genetic disorder with autosomal recessive inheritance, meaning that a person must inherit a genetic mutation from each parent to be affected.

Diagnosis
The most effective way to diagnose CII deficiency is by measuring the activity of complex II in the muscles.

Prognosis
In more severe cases where multiple organ systems are affected, death can occur in early life due to multisystem failure.

References

Rare diseases
Genetic diseases and disorders
Mitochondrial diseases
Autosomal recessive disorders